Khayyum is an Indian actor who has appeared in more than 100 Telugu films.

Early life
Khayyum was born in Rajahmundry, Andhra Pradesh, and brought up in Hyderabad. His father was a tailor and his mother was a housewife. He is the brother of actor Ali. In 2015, he married Arshia Kamal, daughter of Guntur-based businessman Shaikh Nayab Kamal.

Filmography

References

External links
 

Indian male film actors
Living people
Male actors in Telugu cinema
Telugu comedians
Male actors from Rajahmundry
20th-century Indian male actors
21st-century Indian male actors
Year of birth missing (living people)